Anti (stylised in all caps) is the eighth studio album by Rihanna, released on 28 January 2016 by Roc Nation and Westbury Road. Rihanna started recording in 2014 after ending her contract with Def Jam Recordings, who had released all of her albums since her debut in 2005. As executive producer, Rihanna recorded Anti with producers including Jeff Bhasker, Boi-1da, DJ Mustard, Hit-Boy, Brian Kennedy, Timbaland and No I.D., at studios in Canada, the United States and France. SZA and Drake contribute guest vocals.

Conceived when Rihanna was experiencing creative struggles and emotional turmoil, Anti features an atmospheric production characterised by lo-fi beats, distorted vocals and downtempo arrangements. The first half consists of bass-heavy tracks, and the second is characterised by textured minimalism. Compared to the radio-friendly dance tunes of her previous albums, Anti is an alternative R&B, pop and dancehall record, more muted and soulful. Its songs explore eclectic styles spanning hip hop, soul, psychedelic, doo-wop, country, synth-rock and trap. Their lyrics are about the emotions ensued from love and relationships, from endearment and desire to betrayal and liberation, with references to sex, drugs and alcohol.

The promotional campaign for Anti from summer 2014 comprised prolonged release delays and a $25 million deal with Samsung. Rihanna announced the cover art and title at the MAMA Gallery on 7 October 2015. The Anti World Tour ran from March to November 2016, and four songs were released as singles, including the US Billboard Hot 100 number one "Work". In the United States, Anti is Rihanna's second number-one album and the first album by a black woman to spend 300 weeks on the Billboard 200. The album topped charts in Canada and Norway, and peaked in the top five on charts in such European countries as Denmark, Germany, Ireland, Spain, Sweden and Switzerland.

In contemporary publications, critics commended the album's emotional honesty but were divided on the production, praise centering on Rihanna's newfound musical freedom and criticism on the unfocused track list. Some took issue with the lack of radio-friendly songs, but others noted the musical shift marked Rihanna's artistic maturity as an album artist beyond her status as a pop star. At the 2017 Grammy Awards, the album and its singles received six nominations, including one for Best Urban Contemporary Album. Anti featured on 2010s decade-end lists by such publications as Billboard, NME and Pitchfork. It ranked 230th on Rolling Stone 2020 edition of the 500 Greatest Albums of All Time.

Background
Barbadian singer Rihanna's seventh studio album, Unapologetic, was released on 19 November 2012, by Def Jam Recordings. Unapologetic combines urban and R&B with radio-friendly pop tunes and dubstep influences, and its lyrics are about Rihanna's sexual autonomy and emotional struggles. Critics likened the sound and themes of Unapologetic to those of her previous albums, namely Rated R (2009), Loud (2010) and Talk that Talk (2011). She embarked on the Diamonds World Tour to promote the album in 2013, and co-headlined the Monster Tour with American rapper Eminem in 2014. After touring, Rihanna intended to take a year off to "just do whatever [she wanted] artistically, creatively", but reportedly started recording new music as soon as October 2014.

Unapologetic was Rihanna's last album under Def Jam, who had released all of her discography since her first album, Music of the Sun (2005). In March 2014, she signed with American rapper Jay-Z's Roc Nation after leaving Def Jam and gaining the right to her album masters; Jay-Z was her mentor when she first moved from Barbados to the United States. Up to that point, Rihanna had released one studio album each year from 2005 to 2012 (with the exception of 2008), totalling seven.

Recording and production
In an interview with MTV News in March 2015, Rihanna said she wanted her eighth album to be "soulful" and "timeless", having found the "really, really big songs" on her past albums had fallen out of her taste; "I wanted an album that I could perform in 15 years. ... Not any songs that were burnt out." The record was initially to be executive-produced by rapper-producer Kanye West, who had produced the single "FourFiveSeconds" (January 2015) and recorded it with Rihanna and English musician Paul McCartney, but the plan fell through. Although Rihanna wanted the record to represent her authentic self, feeling "numb" and disconnected from her emotions, she experienced an emotional turmoil. Speaking with Sarah Paulson for the October 2019 issue of Interview, Rihanna talked about her spiritual wellbeing while making Anti: "I have been in a place where I felt like maybe I had disappointed god so much that we weren't as close."

The album's recording sessions took place at various studios including the Jungle City Studios in New York City, Westlake Recording Studios, Sandra Gale Studios and Windmark Recording Studios in Los Angeles, SOTA Studios in Toronto and Twin Studios in Paris. Most of the songs were recorded at the Westlake Recording Studios. Songwriter Bibi Bourelly had been working with producer Paperboy Fabe, who arranged a session with West. The result was the song "Higher". Later, Rihanna and James Fauntleroy also contributed to the song writing. "Higher" was recorded in the early morning hours while Rihanna was under the influence of alcohol. "We just said, 'You know what? Let's just drink some whiskey and record this song.'" The song was described by Rihanna as "a drunk voice mail". Rihanna and Fauntleroy also collaborated on three other songs – "Desperado", "Close to You," and "James Joint". The latter was written with Rihanna and Shea Taylor, who wrote the song in less than 30 minutes, while "Close To You" was written after producer Brian Kennedy sent Fauntleroy a piano music sample. 

"Desperado" was written by Mick Shultz and Rook Monroe. After visiting Rihanna's home, Shultz was contacted a week later by the singer's team who stated that she really liked the record. Rihanna, Fauntleroy and Kuk Harrell, were all later involved in the song's development, production and recording. In the summer of 2015, songwriter and producer Rupert Thomas together with Allen Ritter and Boi-1da among others, stayed at Canadian rapper's Drake house in Los Angeles for several days. During the time, the lead single, "Work" was conceived. Thomas created the beat and played it for Boi-1da to which he positively responded. Boi-1da came up with the idea for sampling an "old school dancehall rhythm" after the chords were made. When the song's music was finished, Boi-1da sent it to PartyNextDoor who wrote the lyrics.

Two songs each were recorded at Jungle City Studios in New York City and Windmark Recording Studios in Los Angeles. The studio sessions at Jungle City produced the opening track "Consideration" and "Kiss It Better". Rihanna stated when recording "Consideration", she felt a connection to it, stating the song captured the sound and attitude she was aiming for. The recording sessions at Windmark Recording Studios produced the songs "Never Ending" and "Love on the Brain". The former was written by Chad Sabo during his time in California, where Sabo was playing with the band Basic Vacation. Sabo was in the band's van and began to write the intro riff that would become "Never Ending". Shortly after, he took the song home and attempted to bring the song together using a digital 8-track studio. He later worked on the song's lyrics and posted it onto the internet. The writing process of "Never Ending" began in November 2013, and started again in April 2014 at which time Rihanna became interested in the track and wanted to record it. English singer-songwriter Dido is also credited as a writer on the track due to a similarity in the melody of "Never Ending" and Dido's 1999 song "Thank You."

The only song which was recorded outside of the United States was "Same Ol' Mistakes"; the track was recorded at the Twin Studios in Paris. Rihanna's team contacted Tame Impala's management and informed them that Rihanna loved the band's song "New Person, Same Old Mistakes" and asked if she could re-record the track for Anti. The song's writer, Kevin Parker, agreed and gave Rihanna permission to record the song. After hearing Rihanna's version, Parker stated, "We're all really happy with how the song turned out, love it!".

Vocal production

American vocal producer Kuk Harrell, who has been working with Rihanna since 2007, stated that for Anti, Rihanna was creatively more involved in the making process. Harrell stated that she aimed to push the album in the direction she envisioned. The producer stated his attempt to move away from mainstream pop music when producing the album's vocals, "Every record... is a record that somebody else could've done... It's so awesome that she... was courageous enough to... do that."

Harrell noted that with the production of Anti Rihanna was far more meticulous about what she wanted each individual line to sound like. He stated that he attempted to work quickly when producing the album, however Rihanna wanted to constantly improve the album's quality stating, "let's up the quality level. Let's make sure... it's a masterpiece." Harrell stated that when he and Rihanna had previously worked together they aimed to make a great body of work, however on Anti they aimed to create a "masterpiece".

Speaking of the album's production and style, Harrell stated that artists such as Rihanna have been taking a stance and stepping away from the popular music of the time and the expectations of her label, directors, and radio, stating, "I don't want to make what everybody else is making... I know my fans will love it... if everybody else loves it, great. If they don't, at least I know... I've done what I want to do." Anti was engineered by Nathaniel Alford, Chris Godbey, Harrell, Blake Mares, Daniela Rivera and Marcos Tovar. The album was finally mastered by Chris Gehringer at Sterling Sound, in New York City.

Composition

Music and lyrics 

During the album's recording Rihanna aimed to create a record to have "soulful" and "aggressive" sounds in the musical, lyrical and vocal context. During a press conference in early 2014, Rihanna told MTV News that she aimed to depart from the musical style of her previous releases, which she described as being "big songs". Rihanna continued to state that with Anti she wanted to focus on music that "felt real" and soulful and would be timeless. She also stated that she wanted to record songs that are "timeless" and that she could perform 15 years later. "Not any songs that were burnt out. I find that when I get on stage now, I don't want to perform a lot of my songs. They don't feel like me."

Anti abandons the radio-friendly dance-pop production of Rihanna's previous hit singles. It is a genre-spanning record consisting of pop and dancehall tunes with elements of soul music. Compared to Rihanna's previous catalogue, Anti is more muted and soulful. According to Billboard, the album belongs to "the weeded-out, hazy spectrum of rap and alt-R&B". Lindsay Zoladz of Vulture coined the term "industrial dancehall" as the most appropriate to describe Anti. Ben Rayner of The Toronto Star stated the album is divided into two halves; the first consisting of "futuristic robo-R&B", while the second half contains "a more organic breed of soul". The album's production has been characterized as being dark, sparsely layered, bouncy, with lo-fi bass, old school styles, downtempo moodiness and electro-soul minimalism. The bass-heavy production of Anti midsection ("Needed Me", "Woo", "Yeah, I Said It") evokes popular hip hop and R&B genres. The second half of the album is characterised by textual minimalism. Analyzing its sound a year after its release, Da'Shan Smith of Billboard noted the album's present underscoring of trap.

The album's lyrical content predominantly touches upon themes of relationships, exploring what it means to be in love, to get hurt, to need someone, and to be true to yourself. The theme of relationships is picked up in numerous songs; "Kiss It Better" sees Rihanna questioning how far an ex-lover will go to get her back; in "Woo", Rihanna turns spiteful, stating she does not care for her ex-partner, while "Never Ending" features Rihanna admitting she would like to be in love again. The album's themes were also noted as being unapologetic, with an uncaring attitude, and self-assurance.

Songs 

Anti opens with "Consideration", a dub-inspired song. The song contains a "glitchy" production and features guest vocals from singer-songwriter SZA. Neil McCormick of The Telegraph, thought the song is Rihanna turning her back on record labels and their expectations, in the line "I got to do things my own way darling". "James Joint" is a neo-soul song that contains "keyboards built over rising bass riffs that create a thickly textured groove." The song was compared to the work of Stevie Wonder, due to the use of a harmonica. "Kiss It Better" is a pop power ballad inspired by the music of the '80s and '90s. Built over deep synths the track features an electric guitar and lyrics that focus on a destructive relationship that the singer knows is wrong for her, but one she finds irresistible. "Work", which features Canadian rapper Drake, is a reggae-pop song with a "percolating beat, sinuous synth lines, and vocal samples stretched and pulled in a way that recalls Jimmy Jam and Terry Lewiss production work on Janet Jackson's 1997 album The Velvet Rope." "Desperado" is a moody, trap-country song containing a "mid-tempo groove, bell ringing and shuddering drums, along with deep synths and vocal samples."

The sixth track "Woo" opens with "two jarring, atonal guitar chords repeated along with small, trap-influenced percussion, over a basic riff." It was compared to the work of Kanye West due to its slow stomping, distortion, and lack of melody and groove. "Needed Me" is a downtempo song, with small elements of electro bubble, synthetic sounds, and a loose, casual vocal that discusses romantic rejection, while the following song "Yeah, I Said It" continues the trend of containing a slowed down groove. "Same Ol' Mistakes" is a cover version of "New Person, Same Old Mistakes" (2015) performed by Tame Impala. The song contains the same production as the original, featuring a "fluid sound, with elements of psychedelic, hip-hop and pop-rock genres, along with a slow, dreamy, psychedelic synth groove." "Never Ending" is a guitar-led song, with elements of country music, organic melodies and backing vocals.

"Love on the Brain" is a mid-tempo '50s inspired doo-wop ballad "that features a guitar arpeggio, swirling organ, simple chord progression and backing vocals". Rihanna's vocals on the track were noted as being acrobatic and ranging from her "trademark snarl", to high notes, with dark lyrics that depict a destructive, yet addictive relationship. "Higher" is a love song that has a woozy production that contains lyrics about Rihanna's feelings towards her lover whilst she is under the influence of drugs and alcohol. "Close to You" is a slow piano ballad, which is sung in a jazz style. The deluxe version of Anti contains three more songs. The first is "Goodnight Gotham", which contains an interpolation of "Only If for a Night" (2011) performed by Florence and the Machine and hears Rihanna singing along with the "looping" sample. The following track "Pose" features a grimy beat, along with the singer aggressively boasting about her riches. "Sex with Me" contains dreamy production which hears Rihanna talking about her beauty, "before closing with a trippy blend of vocals."

Title and packaging

On 7 October 2015, Rihanna held a private viewing for fans and press at Los Angeles' MAMA Gallery, where she debuted the album's official artwork and title. Initially thought to have been entitled R8, Rihanna announced the official title during the album's cover art release, revealing the album would be called ANTI. The exhibition included a piece of art which defined the album's title, stating that anti is "a person opposed to a particular policy, activity or idea." Following the exhibition, Rihanna took to social media to confirm the album's title along with an explanation of its meaning. The explanation stated, "By continuing to follow her own instincts, her work strives to make an impact by doing the very antithesis of what the public expects."

The artwork was designed by Israeli artist Roy Nachum, and was described by Rihanna as her "favorite album cover". The album's front cover shows an image of Rihanna, which was taken on her first day of day care, holding a black balloon, with a gold crown covering her eyes; the majority of the artwork is black and white with a "smattering" of red paint. Speaking about the cover art's concept, Nachum stated that he painted a young Rihanna to represent her "bringing something new" to music.

Over the red, black, and white canvas, there is a poem written in Braille by poet Chloe Mitchell. Speaking on her choice to use the language, Rihanna commented, "Sometimes the ones who have sight are the blindest." During the cover's designing stage, Rihanna met with Mitchell, in which they "drank" and came up with a poem that would be used for the artwork and liner notes entitled If They Let Us. Mitchell explained the poem and its meaning to Rolling Stone magazine, stating it was about being misunderstood, but still being able to stand out while doing what is right for you. She further said that the poem speaks about not conforming to society and being a leader as well as accepting that being misunderstood is a positive thing.

At the gallery, the album's back cover, along with multiple inside album artworks were revealed. The album's back cover features the same image this time from behind. The seven pieces of artwork were all named and featured a poem written by Mitchell or Nachum, the front and back covers were titled "If They Let Us Part I" and "If They Let Us Part II" and featured a poem that was split over the front and back. Another piece entitled "If They Let Us" was commissioned and featured the full reading of the poem. The inside booklet contains a further five pieces entitled "Fire Part I", "Fire Part II", "Fire Part III" and "R". Billboard ranked the artwork as one of the best covers of the albums released in 2016 and wrote, "What's black and white and red all over? One of the most intoxicating albums of any genre in 2016, with an equally indelible lead image to match."

Singles

"Work" featuring Canadian rapper Drake was released on 27 January 2016, hours before the Tidal release of Anti. Rihanna stated on Twitter that the song is the "first single" from her album. "Work" debuted at number nine on the US Billboard Hot 100 chart. It became Rihanna's 27th top ten hit. With this feat, Rihanna tied Mariah Carey, Janet Jackson and Elton John as the artists with fifth-most top ten songs on the chart. The singer reached 27 top ten singles on the Hot 100 in a span of 10 years and eight months between her first song, "Pon de Replay" and "Work" and became the fastest solo artist to reach the plateau. In its fourth week, "Work" peaked at number one on the Hot 100 chart and became Rihanna's fourteenth number-one song in the United States and the 1,052nd number-one single on the chart overall. Subsequently, she became the artist with the fourth-most number-one songs on the chart following the Beatles with 20 and Carey with 19, and Elvis Presley with 17. She broke a tie with Michael Jackson, who had reached 13 chart-toppers on the Billboard Hot 100.

On 29 March 2016, Rihanna announced that "Needed Me" and "Kiss It Better" would both be serviced to radio the following day as the album's second and third singles. "Needed Me" saw far greater success becoming Rihanna's 28th top ten single on the Hot 100, tying her with Stevie Wonder for fourth place as the acts with the most top tens in Billboard history. It notably became her longest charting Hot 100 hit, surpassing the 41-week run of "We Found Love". "Kiss It Better" was a moderate success charting at the lower end of the US Billboard Hot 100, initially released as the promotional focus at pop radio, "Kiss It Better" reached as far as number twenty-four on the Pop Songs chart, leading Roc Nation to release "Needed Me"—an initially "urban radio priority"—to pop radio as well, due to its success.

On 21 August 2016, Rihanna announced via her Instagram account that "Love on the Brain" will be the next single. Prior to being announced as a single, "Love on the Brain" debuted on the US Billboard Hot R&B/Hip-Hop Songs at number 30 and charted on the Billboard Hot 100, debuting at number 83. After being released as a single, the song re-entered the Billboard Hot 100 chart at number 80. The song peaked at number five, becoming the third top ten single from Anti, as well as her twenty-second top five hit.

Release and promotion

Rihanna started a social media promotional campaign with the hashtag "#R8" as soon as summer 2014; her social media posts included pictures taken with record producers in studios. From January to April 2015, Rihanna released three singles—"FourFiveSeconds" featuring Kanye West and Paul McCartney, "Bitch Better Have My Money", and "American Oxygen"—none of which made the track listing of Anti. Rihanna also posted an interlude entitled "James Joint" in its entirety from the upcoming album on her website on 21 April 2015, as a "celebration of 420".
In October 2015, it was revealed that Rihanna had acquired the masters to all her recordings and would be releasing Anti jointly through her own record label Westbury Road and Roc Nation.

In November 2015, it was announced that Rihanna had signed a $25 million contract with Samsung to not only promote the Galaxy line of products, but to also sponsor the release of Anti and its supporting tour. On 19 November 2015, Rihanna and Samsung released a 16-second cryptic video for Anti, launching a website for Rihanna's forthcoming album entitled "ANTIdiaRy". Upon launch, the mobile-only site gave messages, such as "She's waiting for you. Are you in?" and "Be patient and keep your eyes open". The website then proceeded to launch eight "rooms" over the following 9 weeks, each loosely corresponding to her previous albums, detailing her personal life over the course of her career and including clues from Anti. In the same month, she canceled her performance at the Victoria's Secret Fashion Show to finish work on Anti.

The Anti World Tour was announced on 23 November 2015. The Samsung-sponsored tour started in March 2016 and ended in November 2016, with Travis Scott supporting in North America, and Big Sean supporting at selected European dates.
The album leaked onto the internet in its entirety on 27 January 2016, after it was released prematurely on music streaming service Tidal. Also through Tidal, one million copies of the album were made available for free download via Samsung, regardless of whether a listener is a Tidal subscriber or not. The album was released officially worldwide on online stores, like iTunes, two days later.

Critical reception

Anti received generally positive reviews from music critics, but critics were more mixed over its sound and Rihanna's artistic direction. At Metacritic, which assigns a normalised rating out of 100 to reviews from professional publications, Anti received an average score of 73 out of 100, indicating "generally favorable reviews", based on 31 reviews. The aggregate site AnyDecentMusic? assigned it a score of 6.7 out of 10, based on their assessment of the critical consensus.

Many critics noted Anti as an experimental record compared to Rihanna's previous market-oriented pop albums. Those unimpressed took issue with the absence of radio-friendly songs and deemed the album half-hearted and disorienting, but those complimentary said it represented Rihanna's artistic maturity as an album artist, transcending her previous image as a pop star with serial hit singles. Alexis Petridis in The Guardian and Jon Caramanica in The New York Times described Anti as a frustrating record without a clear artistic vision. Writing for Vice, Robert Christgau lauded the album's catchy production despite its rejection of the formulaic pop song structure. In Spin, Jia Tolentino was somewhat disappointed by the unfocused track list, but welcomed Anti as a sign of artistic evolution: "For once, Rihanna is drawing on whims rather than characters, uncertainties rather than pronouncements, her own desires rather than the desires of her audience."

Critics highlighted the diverse musical styles and honest emotional sentiments as a testament to Rihanna's newfound artistic freedom. Some, including Neil McCormick of The Daily Telegraph, deemed the experimentation proved Rihanna no longer expected to monetise her music. In Rolling Stone, Brittany Spanos remarked that with Anti, after a decade of releasing chart hits, Rihanna was finally "in charge of her own sound, remaking pop on her own terms". Though some remarked that the album was self-assured and confident, Amanda Petrusich writing for Pitchfork appreciated Rihanna's newfound introspection and vulnerability, calling it "a fun and conflicted pop record, at its most interesting when it's at its smallest and most idiosyncratic". The Los Angeles Times critic Mikael Wood similarly commended her inward vision, specifically through the second half's balladry, for "pushing back against her established image" as a flippant pop star. Writing for The Independent, Emily Jupp found the record abundant with Rihanna's self-confidence and underrated singing, disproving "anyone who ever said her voice could only do certain things and showing them she can do anything she wants to."

Accolades

Anti won the award for Favorite Soul/R&B Album at the 2016 American Music Awards. The record received a nomination for Top R&B Album at the 2016 and 2017 Billboard Music Awards and was also nominated for Best Urban Contemporary Album and Best Recording Package at the 59th Annual Grammy Awards. Prior to the Grammy nominations announcement, media outlets predicted that Anti would be nominated for Album of the Year; following the announcement reporters were surprised and felt that the album had been "snubbed". Fellow musicians also believed that the album should have been nominated, with Chance the Rapper stating that the album was "underrated". Apart from Antis nominations, several songs from it were also nominated including "Work" for Record of the Year and Best Pop Duo/Group Performance, "Needed Me" for Best R&B Performance and "Kiss It Better" for Best R&B Song. At the 2017 iHeartRadio Music Awards Anti received the award for 'R&B Album of the Year'.

According to Metacritic, it was the 12th most prominently ranked album of 2016. NME considered it the 40th best album of the year. On their list of 50 Best Albums of 2016, Rolling Stone placed the album at number 25 and wrote, "Rihanna's long-simmering eighth album brought together stinging songs that showcased the pop provocateur's ever-widening range, both stylistically and vocally." The Independents Roisin O'Connor ranked the album at number 15 out of 20 music releases of 2016 and wrote, "Anti was the moment Rihanna finally asserted herself as an album artist, after reigning as queen of the singles charts for so many years." The Billboard Staff placed the album at number 11 on their list 50 Best Albums of 2016. Jamieson Cox of Time ranked the record at number seven on their list The Top 10 Best Albums for 2016 and wrote, "Rihanna might be the most charismatic person on the planet, and Anti is her first album to recognize that said charisma is her greatest strength." Christgau ranked its deluxe version as the second best album of the year in his ballot for The Village Voices annual Pazz & Jop critics poll.

Lewis Corner of Digital Spy ranked the album at number seven on his list of 20 best albums of 2016. Same as Corner, Harriet Gibsone of The Guardian also ranked the album at number seven deeming it as one of the "messiest album releases", but also a record that show that Rihanna is one of the greatest music rock stars. In their mid-year report, Entertainment Weekly placed Anti at number four on the list of The 25 best albums of 2016. For the publication, Leah Greenblatt wrote, "Anti's wild, woozy R&B easily earned 24-karat status all on its own." On their final Best Albums of 2016 list, the publication ranked the album at number three and called it "The Emancipation of RiRi", a reference to Mariah Carey's tenth studio album, The Emancipation of Mimi. Rap-Up additionally placed it at number three on their list of 20 Best Albums of 2016. Fuse ranked Anti at number one on their list The 20 Best Albums of 2016, highlighting the sounds of the album, Rihanna's vocals and the celebration of womanhood. The Fader recognized the release as one of the 24 Albums That Made Albums Matter Again in 2016 and included four songs of the album in their "The Best Songs of 2016" list: "Sex with Me" at number one, "Work" at number 16, "Higher" at number 36 and "Needed Me" at 51. According to Metacritic, Anti was the eighth most mentioned album on the Best of the Decade Top 10 Album lists. Some of the publications ranking the album as one of the best of the 2010s decade are:

Commercial performance
In the United States, the Recording Industry Association of America (RIAA) certified Anti platinum denoting one million copies sold two days after its release, brought by Samsung purchasing one million copies and giving them away as a free download, as part of the November 2015 deal. The album debuted at number 27 on the Billboard 200 chart dated 13 February 2016. Despite its first-week sales of 1.4 million downloads, Billboard did not recognize free album sales via promotions. According to data provider Nielsen SoundScan for Billboard, recognized first-week of Anti included 4.7 million streams and 126,000 digital songs. The following week, the album topped the Top R&B/Hip-Hop Albums chart and the Billboard 200, marking Rihanna's second number one on the latter.

Anti peaked atop the Billboard 200 for two non-consecutive weeks, claiming the top spot on the chart week ending 2 April 2016. The same week, its lead single "Work" topped the Billboard Hot 100, marking Rihanna's second time to top both the Billboard 200 and Hot 100 charts; Unapologetic and "Diamonds" topped the charts in December 2012. According to Nielsen SoundScan, Anti was the ninth-best-selling album and the fourth-most-consumed album of 2016 in the United States, amassing 603,000 pure sales, 4.195 million song downloads, and over 1.4 billion streams. By January 2022, the album became the first album by a black female act to spend 300 weeks on the Billboard 200. The RIAA certified Anti triple platinum, marking three million album-equivalent units based on sales and streaming. On the issue dated February 25, 2023, Anti returned to the top ten of the Billboard 200 at number 8 with 36,000 units, following her Superbowl LVII halftime performance.

Anti topped the albums charts in Canada and Norway. In the United Kingdom, the album peaked at number seven on the UK Albums Chart and number one on the UK R&B Chart; the British Phonographic Industry (BPI) certified it platinum for surpassing 300,000 units. The album peaked within the top five of albums charts in many European countries, reaching number two in Ireland, Sweden and Switzerland; number three in Denmark, Germany and the Netherlands; number four in Greece and Spain; and number five in the Czech Republic and Finland. It received multi-platinum certifications in France (double platinum) and Denmark (triple platinum). Anti was the most-streamed album by a female artist on Spotify of 2016 worldwide. According to the International Federation of the Phonographic Industry (IFPI), it sold over one million copies worldwide in 2016. According to Billboard, the album sold 11 million in album-equivalent units as of 2021.

Impact
Doreen St. Félix of MTV News stated that Anti was a "rock-star" album and was noted as a "banner for heterogeneity in R&B — the real range of it," continuing to state that in the early 2010s EDM was the popular genre. St. Félix stated in a more in-depth review that "Anti could even change with the seasons, depending on which tracks you chose to listen to." Alexis Petridis of The Guardian stated that R&B was in a "golden age" and 2016 "was its most potent year yet". Petridis stated that artists such as Rihanna pushed the genre's "boundaries", noting that Anti was  "sprawling, exploratory and opaque". The album's commercial performance, especially its streaming performance, was noted as helping R&B "flourish" again, along with Drake and Kanye West. Rihanna was cited as the second most streamed artist of 2016 overall, earning 795 million streams by June and was named the most streamed female of 2016 and 2017 by Spotify. Anti produced eight songs that topped the Billboard Dance Club Songs chart — "Work", "Kiss It Better", "Needed Me", "Love on the Brain", "Sex with Me", "Pose", "Desperado" and "Consideration" — surpassing Katy Perry's Teenage Dream (2010) as the album with the most number-one songs on that chart.

Rolling Stones journalist Brittany Spanos stated that Rihanna was one of three black women, alongside Beyoncé and Solange, who "radicalized Pop in 2016". In an in-depth review, Spanos stated "the album is a startlingly direct statement from a black female pop star, one that many are not afforded the opportunity to express. In the media, black women are often cast as either jezebels or mammies – oversexed or undersexed with no choice as to how they are received. Rihanna's resistance to typecasting and her positive affirmation of her sexual agency made her the year's slyest rebel, a maverick living life as she pleases." Taj Rani of Billboard stated "Work" has brought the genre of dancehall to the forefront of American music, as it became the first dancehall song to top the Billboard Hot 100 since Sean Paul's "Temperature" reached the feat in 2006. She opined the song is a prime example of "an unapologetic black woman proudly showing her heritage at a time when our politics are dominated by #BlackLivesMatter and Donald Trump's racist, xenophobic and misogynistic tirades." Da'Shan Smith of Billboard stated "Love on the Brain" became the most subtly influential pop single of 2017, as the music industry experienced "a prominent surge of retro-harkening balladry, across different musical genres", following the success of this song on pop radio; which he described as "a rare find today, because traditional R&B's presence on the format is an oddity."

Marilyn Manson cited Anti as an influence on his band's album Heaven Upside Down, saying: "Strangely enough, one of the records that influenced this album strongly, and it can't be taken literally, is Rihanna, her last record. That one song, 'Love on the Brain', it really hit me because I saw her perform it and she just... meant it." Album track "Higher" inspired the song "Liability" from New Zealand singer Lorde's second album Melodrama (2017), when Lorde was reportedly "moved to tears" listening to "Higher" and this helped her to write "Liability". Contemporary artist Awol Erizku created a series of pieces inspired by musicians, one of the pieces was titled, "Same Ol' Mistakes," inspired by the song of the same name from the album Anti. Referencing one of Rihanna's logos, Erizku spoke of how the song inspired his artwork, stating: "I always thought that logo was really funny. It's one aspect of pop culture that I thought fit in my world, Rihanna is a voice of our generation, one of our ideals of beauty. You can see these two things co-existing in the same environment." In 2020, Rolling Stone ranked Anti at number 230 on their The 500 Greatest Albums of All Time list.

Track listing
Credits adapted from Rihanna's official website.

Notes
  signifies a co-producer
  signifies an additional producer
  signifies a vocal producer
 "Work" features additional vocals by PartyNextDoor.
 "Desperado" features additional background vocals by James Fauntleroy.
 "Woo" features additional vocals by Travis Scott.

Sample credits
 "Work" contains an interpolation of "If You Were Here Tonight" (1985) performed by Alexander O'Neal, written by Monte Moir.
 "Same Ol' Mistakes" is a cover version of "New Person, Same Old Mistakes" (2015) performed by Tame Impala, written by Kevin Parker.
 "Never Ending" contains interpolations from the composition "Thank You" (2000) performed by Dido, written by Dido Armstrong and Paul Herman.
 "Higher" contains elements from "Beside You" (1970) performed by the Soulful Strings, written by Jerry Butler, Kenny Gamble and Leon Huff.
 "Goodnight Gotham" contains an interpolation of "Only If for a Night" (2011) performed by Florence and the Machine, written by Paul Epworth and Florence Welch.

Personnel
Credits are adapted from Rihanna's website.

Performers and musicians

Rihanna – vocals and songwriting
SZA – vocals 
Drake – vocals 
Joseph Angel – keyboards , drums 
Fred Ball – keyboards , drums 
Nuno Bettencourt – guitar 
James Fauntleroy – additional backing vocals 
Brian Kennedy – keyboards 
Carter Lang – organ , synth bass 
No I.D. – keyboards 
Kevin Parker – all instruments 
PartyNextDoor – additional vocals 
Brian Schultz – bass guitar 
Mick Schultz – guitar 
Travis Scott – additional vocals 
Shea Taylor – keyboards 

Production

Nathaniel Alford – additional engineering 
Joseph Angel – arrangements 
Fred Ball – production 
Jeff Bhasker – production 
Ray C. Brown, Jr. – assistant 
Boi-1da – production 
Noel Cadastre – recording , mixing 
Frank Dukes – co-production 
DJ Mustard – production 
James Fauntleroy – additional vocal arrangement 
Chris Galland – assistant mixing 
Chris Gehringer – mastering
Chris Godbey – additional recording , mixing 
Stan Greene – music recording , music mixing 
Kuk Harrell – vocal production, recording 
Hit-Boy – production 
Jeff Jackson – assistant mixing 
Glass John – additional production 
Daniel Jones – production 
Brian Kennedy – production 
Etienne Macor – assistant 
Fade Majah – production 
Blake Mares – assistant , additional recording 
Manny Marroquin – mixing 
Mitus – production 
Brendan Morawski – assistant 
No I.D. – production 
Kevin Parker – production , music mixing 
Rihanna – executive production
Daniela Rivera – additional engineering 
Chad Sabo – production , music recording , music mixing 
Ike Schultz – assistant mixing 
Mick Schultz – production 
Travis Scott – additional production 
Scum – production 
Noah "40" Shebib – vocal production , recording , mixing 
Phil Tan – mixing 
Shea Taylor – production 
Timbaland – production 
Marcos Tovar – recording
Twice As Nice – co-production 
Vinylz – additional production 
Thomas Warren – assistant 
Krystin "Rook Monroe" Watkins – additional vocal arrangement 
Chad Wilson – assistant 

Design and management
Chloe Mitchell – poetry
Roy Nachum – artwork, poetry
Ciara Parrdo – creative direction
Rihanna – creative direction, poetry

Charts

Weekly charts

Monthly charts

Year-end charts

Decade-end charts

All-time chart

Certifications

Release history

See also
 List of UK R&B Albums Chart number ones of 2016
 List of Billboard 200 number-one albums of 2016
 List of Billboard number-one R&B/hip-hop albums of 2016
 List of number-one albums of 2016 (Canada)
 List of number-one albums of 2016 (Norway)

References

External links
 Promotional website
 

2016 albums
Rihanna albums
Roc Nation albums
Albums produced by Boi-1da
Albums produced by Brian Kennedy (record producer)
Albums produced by DJ Mustard
Albums produced by Hit-Boy
Albums produced by Jeff Bhasker
Albums produced by Kevin Parker
Albums produced by Kuk Harrell
Albums produced by No I.D.
Albums produced by Noah "40" Shebib
Albums produced by PartyNextDoor
Albums produced by Timbaland
Albums produced by Travis Scott
Albums recorded at Westlake Recording Studios
Surprise albums
Pop albums by Barbadian artists
Alternative R&B albums
Dancehall albums
Hip hop albums by Barbadian artists